Mödling is a train station in Mödling, Austria. It is served by Vienna S-Bahn lines S1 and S2 and regional trains.

External links

 Station information at oebb.at

References 

Mödling
Railway stations in Lower Austria
Railway stations in Austria opened in 1841
Railway stations in Austria opened in the 19th century